John Alexander Johnston (22 February 1858 – 5 January 1940) was an American military officer and commissioner of the District of Columbia born in Allegheny, Pennsylvania.  He served as a brigadier general during World War I.

Military career 

Johnston graduated from the United States Military Academy in 1879, graduating twenty-third out of sixty seven. He was commissioned into the cavalry and performed frontier duty in Texas from 1879 to 1882. In 1883, he was an honor graduate from the Infantry and Cavalry School at Fort Leavenworth, Kansas, after which he became an instructor there, instructing on the art of war and engineering until 1885.

In 1886, Johnston was promoted to first lieutenant and would alternate between frontier duty in South Dakota multiple times, from 1886–87, 1891–93 and 1895–97. Between his tours of frontier duty in South Dakota, Johnston taught history, law and tactics at the U.S. Military Academy from 1887–91, and horsemanship at the Jefferson Barracks Cavalry Depot, Missouri, from 1893–1895. Johnston would spend the remainder of his career in the Adjutant General's Department in Washington, D.C., mustering in and out all the volunteers of the Spanish–American War and the Philippine Insurrection, being promoted to brigadier general in 1901 and ultimately resigning on January 15, 1903. Johnston would remain in Washington D.C. after his resignation, working as a commissioner for the District of Columbia from 1910–1913.

On August 5, 1917, Johnston was promoted to brigadier general and placed in command of the Northeastern Department in Boston. In June 1918, he succeeded Frederick Emil Resche as commander of the 68th Infantry Brigade, a unit of the 34th Division. In October 1918, he was assigned to command the division, and he received the Army Distinguished Service Medal at the end of the war. The citation for the medal reads:

Personal life 

Johnston married Henrietta V. Vandergrift in 1888.

Death and legacy

He died on January 5, 1940, at the age of 81.  He is buried in Arlington National Cemetery.

References 

1858 births
1940 deaths
United States Military Academy alumni
United States Military Academy faculty
United States Army generals
Burials at Arlington National Cemetery
United States Army generals of World War I
Military personnel from Pennsylvania